Cushman/Amberg Communications is an independent communications agency headquartered in Chicago with an additional office in St. Louis.

History 
The agency was founded in Chicago in 1952 by Aaron Cushman as Aaron D. Cushman and Associates, signing the Illinois Eisenhower for President Campaign as one of its first clients. After an early focus in the entertainment industry, the agency expanded to serve a range of companies, from start-ups to Fortune 100s.

Over the years, the agency has maintained several satellite offices to serve different niche markets.  Past offices include New York City; Los Angeles; Washington, D.C; and Omaha.

Following a 12-year career in the newspaper business, Thomas Amberg joined Aaron D. Cushman and Associates in 1983 and purchased the agency in early 1997, changing the name to reflect new ownership. The agency acquired boutique public relations firm Chuck Werle and Associates in 2000 and the healthcare marketing/public relations shop HealthInfo Direct in late 2006.

The agency’s capabilities include strategic counsel, media and analyst relations, crisis communications, social/online, message mapping, media training, media measurement, internal communications, editorial services, graphic design, event planning and executive positioning.

Sources 
St. Louis Business Journal - Largest Public Relations Firms
 Hoover's Company Database
 St. Louis Business Journal - Cushman/Amberg acquires HealthInfo Direct
 Answers.com
 O'Dwyer's PR Firm Database
 Council of PR Firms: The Firm Voice
 Inside the Minds: The Art of Public Relations 
Thomas L. Amberg, Christopher P.A. Komisarjevsky, Rich Jernstedt, Ron Watt, Sr., Richard Edelman, Lou Rena Hammond, Anthony J. Russo, PhD., Robyn M. Sachs, Patrice A. Tanaka, and David Finn. Inside the Minds: The Art of Public Relations. 2002-->

References

External links
Cushman/Amberg website

Public relations companies of the United States